The Marshall Islands War Memorial Park is a beachfront park located in Delap on Majuro Atoll, Marshall Islands. The park was part of the U.S. Headquarters Command Center for the Marshall Islands, which was responsible for administering the Marshall Islands following World War II. It was located next to the main U.S. airfield on the atoll until 1971, when a new airfield opened; it then became a collection point for World War II artifacts. The park includes weaponry and vehicles, such as Zeros and large ammunition pieces, from throughout the islands.

The park was added to the U.S. National Register of Historic Places on September 30, 1976. At the time, the Marshall Islands were part of the Trust Territory of the Pacific Islands.

References

War Memorial Park
Majuro
Marshall Islands in World War II
World War II memorials
War Memorial Park
War Memorial Park
World War II on the National Register of Historic Places